Avikkottai is a village in the Pattukkottai taluk of Thanjavur district, Tamil Nadu, India.

Demographics 

As per the 2001 census, Avikkottai had a total population of 1291 with 636 males and 655 females. The sex ratio was 1030. The literacy rate was 83.17.

References 

 

Villages in Thanjavur district